Kalambay is both a surname and a given name. Notable people with the name include:

Mike Kalambay (born 1987), Congolese singer-songwriter
Patrick Kalambay (born 1984), Italian footballer
Sumbu Kalambay (born 1956), Italian boxer
Kalambay Otepa (born 1948), Congolese footballer